The 1950 Pacific typhoon season has no official bounds; it ran year-round in 1950, but most tropical cyclones tend to form in the northwestern Pacific Ocean between June and December. These dates conventionally delimit the period of each year when most tropical cyclones form in the northwestern Pacific Ocean.

The scope of this article is limited to the Pacific Ocean, north of the equator and west of the international date line. Storms that form east of the date line and north of the equator are called hurricanes; see 1950 Pacific hurricane season. This would be the first season that Fleet Weather Center in Guam, predecessor agency to Joint Typhoon Warning Center, would take most of the responsibility in the basin, including naming the storms. Before this season, the storms are identified and named by the United States Armed Services, and these names are taken from the list that USAS publicly adopted before the 1945 season started.

Systems

Severe Tropical Storm One

Typhoon Doris
 Doris was an intense category 4 super Typhoon that mostly remained out to sea. It formed on May 6, peaked as a strong category 4, and then dissipated on May 14. Doris reached a very low pressure of 922 mbar.

Tropical Storm 02W
 This storm impacted Taiwan.

Typhoon Elsie

CMA Severe Tropical Storm Six

Typhoon Flossie

Typhoon Grace
 Typhoon Grace impacted Korea and Japan.

Tropical Storm Helene
 This storm stalled near Japan and accelerated towards China.

Tropical Storm Thirteen

Tropical Storm Fifteen

Tropical Storm Sixteen
 This storm was the third and last storm consecutively to make landfall on Japan.

Typhoon Ida

Tropical Depression Twenty
 This storm impacted Japan and South Korea. This storm also occurred in the Korean War, where Korean soldiers were battling in South Korea during the storm's impact on land.

Severe Tropical Storm Twenty-one
Severe Tropical Storm Twenty-one was a severe tropical storm that remained in open waters.

Severe Tropical Storm Twenty-three
 Severe Tropical Storm Twenty-Three tracked through Japan.

Typhoon Jane

Typhoon Jane struck the island of Shikoku in Japan on 3 September. Resulting flooding and landslides killed 539 people.

In late August, a depression formed and quickly intensified into a tropical storm and was given the name Jane. The storm drifted west-northwestward and intensified into a typhoon. Jane gradually curved to the north and intensified to a category 2 typhoon. Jane shortly reached category 3 status and peak intensity at 185 km/h (115 mph). The typhoon accelerated to the north-northeast and weakened to a category 2 storm and made landfall in the modern-day Osaka-Kobe-Kyoto area. Jane crossed Kyoto Prefecture and weakened to a tropical storm and crossed the Noto Peninsula and reentered the Sea of Japan and passed just west of Sado Island. The storm struck eastern Aomori Prefecture and crossed the Tsugaru Straits and made a final landfall on the south coast of Hokkaido Prefecture. Jane crossed Hokkaido and dissipated south of the Kuril Islands.

Typhoon Kezia

On September 13 Typhoon Kezia hit part of the fleet off Kyushu.

P-51 Mustangs belonging to No. 77 Squadron RAAF were grounded at Iwakuni because of the typhoon on September 13 and 14.

There was great damage in western Japan. In Japan, 30 dead, 19 missing people, 35 injured. The total damage and breakage of the house is 4,836. There are 121,1924 inundated houses. In the Itsukushima Shrine the building was damaged, the Kintai Bridge was lost.

Severe Tropical Storm Twenty-six
 This storm tracked through Vietnam and Laos.

Tropical Storm Lucretia-Nancy

Typhoon Missatha
 Typhoon Missatha paralleled Japan.

Typhoon Ossia
 Typhoon Ossia impacted the Philippines.

Typhoon Petie

Severe Tropical Storm Thirty-five

Typhoon Ruby-Anita

Typhoon Billie

Typhoon Clara

Tropical Storm Delilah
 This tropical storm affected the Philippines.

Severe Tropical Storm Ellen
 Ellen remained at sea, without impacting land.

Typhoon Fran

Typhoon Fran was a late season storm that struck the northern Philippines killing 5 people.

Storm names
21 names were used during the season, the first being Doris and the last being Fran.

Names decommissioned
For unknown reasons, the names Helene, Jane, Kezia, Lucretia, Missatha, Ossia, Petie, Salome and Delilah were replaced with Helen, June, Kathy, Lorna, Marie, Olga, Pamela, Sally and Dot.

See also

 1950 Atlantic hurricane season
 List of Pacific typhoon seasons
 1950s South-West Indian Ocean cyclone seasons
 1950s Australian region cyclone seasons
 1950s South Pacific cyclone seasons

References

External links
 Unisys season tracks
 List of DOD publishing organizations and basins covered for the entire 1945-2000 period.